The Second Battle of Apia was the final engagement of the Second Samoan Civil War, and possibly fought as an attempted act of defiance by the Samoan rebels after being given an ultimatum that would have denied them access to Apia.

Battle
After the third battle of Vailele, the Allies declared that so long as the Mataafans stay out of Apia, they would not take action against them. The following month, on April 25, the Mataafans attacked American troops on patrol outside of Apia, but the rebels were driven off.

References

Apia, Second
History of Apia
1899 in Samoa
Apia, Second
Apia, Second
April 1899 events
19th century in Apia